Celeirós is a civil parish in the Trás-os-Montes municipality of Sabrosa. The population in 2011 was 222, in an area of 5.25 km².

History
Historically, the parish of Celeirós has its origins in a foral (charter) that was issued by Afonso Henriques on 4 December 1160.

The Casa dos Botelhos Pimenteis (House of the Botelho-Pimental Family) dates to the 19th century, and, along with the Casa da Fonte (House of the Fountain), with its richly -sculpted exterior and coat-of-arms, represent some of the older estates that permeated the Douro valley. Similarly, the Casa do Bucheiro (House of the Bucheiro Family), another family estate with noble crest, it was the home of one of the early founders of the community. Other examples include the Casa dos Vilares (House of the Vilar Family) erected in the 20th century, and the Casa do Padre Fausto (House of Father Fausto).

Geography

The parish is serviced by garbage pickup, water supplies and sewage treatment, in addition to its local installations that include: day centre, health centre, post office, primary school, mini-market and other shops.

Economy
Celeirós, is known locally for its Porto and table wines.

So known for its wines with fruity taste, in 1756 it was garland for its quality and excellence.

Architecture
Apart from the classification of Celeiros, by the Instituto de Gestão do Património Arquitectónico e Arqueológico as a historical urban agglomeration, the parish is home to several culturally designated buildings and structures, that date back to the 16th-17th centuries:

Civic
 Residence of the Fountain and Chapel of Saint Francis
 Residence of the Butcher
 Residence of the Vilares
 Celeiros Primary School
 (Old) Fountain of Celeiros

Religious
 Chapel of Santo Amaro, its existence was first mentioned by Father António de Santa Marta Lobo, on 30 March 1758, a chapel in Paradelinha;
 Chapel of São Bento
 Church of São Pedro

References
Notes

Sources
 

Freguesias of Sabrosa